Jaydon Page (born 23 December 2004)   is an Australian Paralympic athlete. He represented Australia at the 2020 Summer Paralympics.

Page lives in Canberra, Australian Capital Territory and attended St Francis Xavier College.

Athletics
Page is classied as T47 athlete. He finished fifth in his heat the Men's 100m T47 at the 2020 Tokyo Paralympics.

At the 2022 Commonwealth Games in Birmingham, he won the silver medal in the Men's 100 m T47.

In 2021, his coach is Sebastian Kuzminski.

References

External links

World Athletics Results

Living people
Paralympic athletes of Australia
Australian male sprinters
Athletes (track and field) at the 2020 Summer Paralympics
2004 births
21st-century Australian people
Athletes (track and field) at the 2022 Commonwealth Games
Commonwealth Games silver medallists for Australia
Commonwealth Games medallists in athletics
Medallists at the 2022 Commonwealth Games